John Dillard "Monk" Tate (March 29, 1934 – May 15, 2020) was an American racing driver, moonshine runner, tobacco farmer and business owner. He was a competitor in the NASCAR Budweiser Late Model Sportsman Series, winning the 1975 Cardinal 500 at Martinsville Speedway.

Racing career
After becoming a racing fan in his youth, Tate started his racing career with a 1938 Chevrolet, driving it at Rainbow Speedway in his late teens. He later raced locally at tracks like Concord International Speedway, Draper Speedway and Log Cabin Raceway. He later expanded to regional racing in the eastern United States, running races as far away as the World Series of Asphalt in Florida. Tate claimed a NASCAR Late Model Sportsman Division win at the Cardinal 500 at Martinsville Speedway in 1975, inheriting the lead late after Butch Lindley slowed from tire wear. After briefly retiring from competitive racing in the 1980s, Tate began vintage racing in 1996 and continued to do so until 2004. Bouncing between stock car racing, late model racing and modified racing, Tate estimated that he won over 1,000 races in his career, including 50 in one particularly successful season. 

Tate also dabbled in car ownership, fielding a ride for Cale Yarborough in 1977 at Trico Motor Speedway. In the 2010s, Tate was a modified car owner at Ace Speedway.

Personal life
Tate was nicknamed "Monk" after he climbed a falling tree in his childhood. He ran moonshine, leading police to trap him one time by blocking both ends of a bridge on the Dan River. The incident landed Tate one night in jail and a probationary period. Tate was a tobacco farmer in the beginning portions of his adult life and later owned Tate Trucking Company until 2019.

Motorsports career results

NASCAR

Budweiser Late Model Sportsman Series

References

External links

1934 births
2020 deaths
Racing drivers from North Carolina
People from Rockingham County, North Carolina
NASCAR drivers